Take My Tip is a 1937 British musical comedy film directed by Herbert Mason (who stage managed some musical revues in the past), produced by Michael Balcon and starring Jack Hulbert, Cicely Courtneidge, Harold Huth and Frank Cellier.

It was made at the Lime Grove Studios in Shepherd's Bush. The film's sets were designed by art director Ernö Metzner. Songs featured include "I Was Anything but Sentimental" and "I'm Like a Little Birdie out of My Cage".

Premise
A pair of aristocrats adopt various disguises to unmask a confidence trickster.

Cast
 Jack Hulbert as Lord George Pilkington
 Cicely Courtneidge as Lady Hattie Pilkington
 Harold Huth as Buchan
 Frank Cellier as Paradine
 Frank Pettingell as Willis
 Philip Buchel as Dancing guest
 Eliot Makeham as Digworthy
 H. F. Maltby as Patchett
 Paul Sheridan as Clerk in Hotel
 Robb Wilton as Foreman

Critical reception
Britmovie called the film a "hilarious rapid-fire musical farce."

Halliwell's Film & Video Guide described the film as a "[reasonably] lively comedy musical adapted for the stars."

References

Bibliography
 Low, Rachael. Filmmaking in 1930s Britain. George Allen & Unwin, 1985.
 Sutton, David R. A chorus of raspberries: British film comedy 1929-1939. University of Exeter Press, 2000.
 Walker, John. (ed). Halliwell's Film & Video Guide 1998. HarperCollins Entertainment, 1998. 13th edition
 Wood, Linda. British Films, 1927-1939. British Film Institute, 1986.

External links

1937 films
British musical comedy films
1930s English-language films
1937 musical comedy films
Films directed by Herbert Mason
British films based on plays
Films based on works by Francis de Croisset
Films shot at Lime Grove Studios
British black-and-white films
Gainsborough Pictures films
1930s British films